Hammam Bou Hadjar is a district in Aïn Témouchent Province, Algeria. It was named after its capital, Hammam Bou Hadjar.

Municipalities
The district is further divided into 4 municipalities:
Hammam Bou Hadjar
Chentouf
Oued Berkèche
Hassasna

References 

Districts of Aïn Témouchent Province